Universal Co-Masonry (incorporated under the laws of Colorado as The American Federation of Human Rights, A.F.H.R. for short), is an international fraternal Masonic organization headquartered in Larkspur, Colorado.  Formally a national Federation of Le Droit Humain, the international order of mixed co-freemasonry, Universal Co-Masonry split off in 1994 to become an independent masonic obedience. The organization seeks to “combat ignorance in all its forms” and works “to the Glory of God and the Perfection of Humanity”. Universal Co-Masonry has created “a Masonic Government that ensures the maximum liberty compatible with a voluntarily accepted discipline and is organized upon the precepts of the Ancient Mystery Schools, the Scottish Rite, and the English Rite”. Universal Co-Masonry is active in North America, South America. Universal Co-Masonry also oversees the administration of the Masonic Philosophical Society, a philosophical discussion and educational society that meets online and in several countries.

Philosophy

Universal Co-Masonry espouses the idea that all human beings are equal, regardless of race, gender, creed or nationality and does not believe that the privileges of Freemasonry should be restricted on the basis of any of these. Universal Co-Masonry views the teachings and philosophies of Freemasonry and other ancient mystery traditions as being essential for the improvement of human society and works to promote values common to all religions throughout the world.

Theosophical influence

The Theosophical Society has had a major influence on the development of Co-Masonry. Founded in 1875 by Helena Blavatsky, Henry Olcott and William Quan Judge, the Theosophical Society promoted ideas of religious unity and philosophical exploration, both central tenets of Universal Co-Masonry. Many Theosophists were women and the Society promoted an interest in the symbolism and rituals of Freemasonry and other similar organizations but as women were barred from participating in the male-only Freemasonry popular at that time many of its members were encouraged to join Co-Masonry. One of the most prominent female Theosophists to join the order was Annie Besant, who attracted numerous English and international Theosophists to the organization. By the late 1930s the American Federation of Le Droit Humain was heavily influenced by Theosophical teachings.

Structure & Organization

Universal Co-Masonry is organized as the United Federation of Lodges, and it practices the Universal rite of Co-Masonry, which is an amalgamation of the Scottish Rite and English Rite Degrees, and is governed by a Supreme Council of the Thirty-Third Degree.

Degrees

Symbolic Masonry "Symbolic Degrees"

1 - Entered Apprentice 
2 - Fellowcraft
3 - Master Mason

English Rite (or York Rite) "Chapter Degrees"

Mark Master Mason
Royal Ark Mariner
Excellent Master
Holy Royal Arch of Jerusalem

Lodge of Perfection "Ineffable Degrees"

4 - Secret Master
5 - Perfect Master
6 - Intimate Secretary
7 - Provost & Judge
8 - Intendant of the Building
9 - Master Elect of Nine
10 - Master Elect of Fifteen
11 - Sublime Master Elect
12 - Grand Master Architect
13 - Royal Arch of Enoch
14 - Grand Elect and Sublime Mason

Chapter Rose Croix "Historic Degrees"

15 - Knight of the East
16 - Prince of Jerusalem
17 - Knight of the East & West
18 - Knight of Rose Croix of Heredom

Council Kadosh "Philosophical and chivalric Degrees"

19 - Grand Pontiff or Sublime Scottish Knight
20 - Sovereign Prince or Master ad Vitam
21 - Noachite or Prussian Knight
22 - Prince of Lebanon or Royal Axe
23 - Chief of the Tabernacle
24 - Prince of the Tabernacle
25 - Knight of the Brazen Serpent
26 - Prince of Mercy
27 - Sovereign Commander of the Temple
28 - Knight of the Sun, Prince Adept
29 - Knight of Saint Andrew
30 - Knight Kadosh

Consistory "Official and Ceremonial Degrees"

31 - Grand Inquisitor Commanders
32 - Sublime Prince of the Royal Secret

Court of Honor "Honorary Degrees"

33 - Grand Inspector General

Grand Commanders

Louis Goaziou (1903-1937)
Edith Armour (1937-1959)
Bertha Williams (1959-1968)
Helen Wycherley (1968-1983)
Calla Haack (1983 -1992)
Vera Bressler (1992-1994)
Magdalena Cumsille (1994–present)

The Masonic Philosophical Society

In early 2008, Universal Co-Masonry began to organize philosophical discussion groups in several countries and online. These groups are organized for the purpose of combating human ignorance through open and civil discussion and debate on a wide variety of topics. MPS study centers are usually tied to a local lodge and volunteers from the order work to hold meetings and run the administrative aspects of the organization. Membership and participation in the Masonic Philosophical Society is open to all people.

Headquarters

The Headquarters of Universal Co-Masonry is located in Larkspur, Colorado on nearly 250 acres dedicated to the Masonic Work of Co-Masonry. The campus contains an Administrative building, Grand Temple, Dormitories, and Conservatory. The Administration was built in 1924 for sole purpose of supporting the work of Co-Masonry in North America. Today this building houses the Co-Masonic Library and Museum, Archive Rooms, and the Executive Chambers of the 33rd Degree. In 1998, it was recognized and listed on the National Register of Historic Places and awarded Landmark status in 2008. The Order's Grand Temple, which was consecrated in 2009 and contains different Temples for the various degrees practiced by the Order. The campus has two dormitories, respectively called the Helen Wycherley and Ursula Monroe Dormitory, and allows Brothers to stay during international conventions and for other Masonic functions. In 2019, the Federation Conservatory was constructed as a dining facility and public forum for presentations and round table discussions. Most of the property is forest that rests at the base of Monkey Face Mountain, once called Human Rights Mountain in the early 20th century. Members can hike the property and enjoy the serenity of nature without the disturbances of modern life.

History

Early history 1903-1939

Universal Co-Masonry was first established in North America under the name The American Federation of Human Rights. It was an affiliate branch of Le Droit Humain, the world's first Co-Masonic organization, which was founded in 1882 in Paris, France. The American Federation of Human Rights, the predecessor to Universal Co-Masonry, was first established in North America by Antoine Muzzarelli, an educator and life-long Freemason, and Louis Goaziou, a French immigrant who had long been active in the industrial labor, women's rights and immigrant movements of Pennsylvania. An anarchist turned socialist, Goaziou believed that there was potential contained within the teachings and philosophies of Co-Masonry to shape a more just society and dedicated his life to its promotion. The American Federation of Human Rights, American Co-Masonry, established its first masonic lodge, Alpha Lodge #301, in Charleroi, Pennsylvania in 1903. In 1916, the organization moved its headquarters to Larkspur, Colorado in order to be more centrally located and establish a retirement center for ageing members.

During the 1920s, American Co-Masonry continued to expand, founding lodge after lodge. It was at this time that Theosophy began to become a significant part of American Co-Masonry, and Louis Goaziou decided that it was in the best interests of the American Federation to maintain a balance between Theosophists and non-Theosophists in the organization. This balance would be maintained until the time of Edith Armour as Grand Commander.

When the stock market crashed in 1929 American Co-Masonry was heavily affected. The organization's membership base had long been poor minors and workers, who were drawn to the organization by its sense of community, and its potential to help organize them. As the Great Depression wore on, many of these members were unable to pay their dues, as their jobs disappeared. Lodges in rural areas began to struggle, and the more wealthy Theosophists became a greater and greater share of the membership, slowly eroding the balance sought by Goaziou. It was during this decade that Louis Goaziou passed, and Edith Armour, a prominent Theosophist, became Grand Commander in 1937.

World War Two & Aftermath 1939-1990

During the Nazi invasion of France in World War II the Nazis launched a campaign of repression against all Masonic organizations in the occupied territory. The Supreme Council of Le Droit Humain, the governing body of the institution, went into hiding without having a chance to make arrangements for the future leadership of international Co-Masonry in their absence. In response to this crisis in the international organization, The Most Puissant Grand Commander of the British Federation of Le Droit Humain, suggested to Edith Armour, M.P.G.C. of the American Federation that the two of them set up two temporary Supreme Councils to administer Co-Masonry in several countries while France was under Nazi occupation. Armour agreed, and the Western Supreme Council under Armour administered the Western Hemisphere of International Co-Freemasonry until the liberation of France and the reformation of the Supreme Council of Le Droit Humain in 1945.

After the war and the return of the supreme council, the almost entirely Theosophical American Co-Masonry begin to decline in membership. This was largely tied to the organizations dominance by the Theosophical society, which encouraged the admission of only Theosophists into the ranks. As the Theosophical society began to decline in membership, so too did American Co-Masonry. This decline continued until the mid-1990s.

The Split From Le Droit Humain 1990-1994

In the early 1990s, philosophical differences between the French leadership of International Co-Masonry (Le Droit Humain) and the members of the American Federation that had been growing for some time came to ahead. The members of the American Federation voted by an overwhelming majority to declare its independence and separate from Le Droit Humain a split that was effected in April 1994. Because The American Federation was incorporated in the United States and was a legally independent corporate entity from Le Droit Humain, this transition was accomplished smoothly and the two organizations parted ways.

American Co-Masonry 1995-2017

After the split, The American Federation of Le Droit Humain created its own Supreme Council headquartered in Larkspur, to replace the Supreme Council of Le Droit Humain. Renaming itself American Co-Masonry the newly independent order also began establishing lodges outside the United States as an independent organization no longer bound by the system of national Federations that Le Droit Humain had used to organize its members. In 2010, the construction of a new Grand Temple was finished in Larkspur, Colorado, the headquarters of the newly formed international organization.

Universal Co-Masonry 2017-Present

In 2017, the Honorable Order of American Co-Masonry: American Federation of Human Rights changed its name to "The Honorable Order of Universal Co-Masonry: United Federation of Lodges" to better reflect the international character of the order.

References

External links
Masonic Philosophical Society

Freemasonry in the United States
Co-Freemasonry
Organizations established in 1994
Douglas County, Colorado